Alamo: The Price of Freedom is a 1988 American IMAX film directed and written by Kieth Merrill and starring Merrill Connally, Casey Biggs, Enrique Sandino, Steve Sandor, Don Swayze, and Derek Caballero. It was distributed by Macgillivray Freeman Films. It is based on the George A. McAlister book of the same name.  It is shown at San Antonio's IMAX Theater in Rivercenter.

Premise
In 1836, soldiers sacrifice their lives in combat in the new Republic of Texas.

Cast
 Merrill Connally as Davy Crockett
 Casey Biggs as William B. Travis
 Enrique Sandino as Antonio López de Santa Anna
 Steve Sandor as James Bowie
 Don Swayze as James Bonham
 Derek Caballero as Juan Seguín
 Martin Cuellar as Toribio Losoya

Production
At the time of its filming, the production generated much controversy among the Tejano population of San Antonio who protested that it was demeaning to their contributions to the city's history.

References

External links
 
 
 Alamo : The Price of Freedom, a music master tape, UA 887 at L. Tom Perry Special Collections, Harold B. Lee Library, Brigham Young University

1988 films
1988 drama films
1988 Western (genre) films
Films set in San Antonio
American Western (genre) films
Films set in 1836
Films shot in Texas
Texas Revolution films
Cultural depictions of Davy Crockett
American drama films
IMAX short films
Siege films
MacGillivray Freeman Films films
IMAX documentary films
1980s English-language films
1980s American films